Sphaerophoria batava  is a Palearctic hoverfly. Identification is problematic and this species is little known.

References

External links
External images

Diptera of Europe
Syrphini
Insects described in 1974